Bohdan Vyunnyk (born 21 May 2002) is a Ukrainian professional footballer who plays as a striker for the Austrian club Grazer AK on loan from Shakhtar Donetsk.

Career
Vyunnyk is a product of the different youth sportive schools, who in 2017 joined the FC Shakhtar Donetsk Academy in the Ukrainian Premier League in 2020.

He played in the Ukrainian Premier League Reserves and made his debut for Shakhtar Donetsk in the 2020–21 UEFA Champions League in a winning away match against Real Madrid on 21 October 2020.

After the 2022 Russian invasion of Ukraine, he fled to Switzerland. There he trained with FC Zürich. Until the summer of 2022 he played for FC Zürich U21, then he was loaned out from Shakhtar Donetsk for one season and included in the first-team squad.

In January 2023 he moved on loan to Grazer AK.

Career statistics

References

External links
 

 Profile on the official website of FC Mariupol 

2002 births
Living people
Footballers from Kharkiv
Ukrainian footballers
Ukraine youth international footballers
Ukraine under-21 international footballers
Association football forwards
FC Shakhtar Donetsk players
FC Mariupol players
FC Zürich players
Grazer AK players
Ukrainian Premier League players
Swiss Super League players
Ukrainian expatriate footballers
Expatriate footballers in Switzerland
Ukrainian expatriate sportspeople in Switzerland
Expatriate footballers in Austria
Ukrainian expatriate sportspeople in Austria